Australian World Orchestra (AWO) is a symphony orchestra based in Australia.

History
The Australian World Orchestra was established in 2011 by Australian conductor Alexander Briger AO and his sister, film maker Gabrielle Thompson AM.  The inaugural patron of the orchestra was Sir Charles Mackerras, Briger and Thompson's uncle.

The first concert in 2011, which was conducted by Briger, performed sold out in concerts in Sydney and Melbourne.  The AWO also sold out in 2013 and 2015.  

Maestro Zubin Mehta conducted the orchestra in 2013, and returned to conduct again in 2015 when the AWO performed in three cities in India, with soprano Greta Bradman as guest soloist. Mehta is to return in 2022 to conduct the AWO in a performance of Strauss' works in Sydney and Melbourne.

In 2015 the AWO brought Sir Simon Rattle to Australia to conduct the orchestra in concerts in Sydney and Melbourne with special guest mezzo-soprano Magdalena Kožená.  Rattle has described the AWO as an "international treasure".

In 2016 Briger premiered the AWO's 5th anniversary commission by Australian composer Elena Kats-Chernin The Witching Hour, A Concerto for Eight Double Basses at the Sydney Opera House and the Esplanade in Singapore.

In 2017 Simone Young AM conducted the AWO in a side-by-side performance of Messiaen's Turangalîla-Symphonie with the Australian National Academy of Music (ANAM) at Arts Centre Melbourne and the AWO Chamber 8 completed their first Australian tour performing at Queensland Performing Arts Centre (QPAC), City Recital Hall Sydney, Melbourne Recital Centre and, Perth Concert Hall.

In 2018 Maestro Riccardo Muti conducted the AWO for performances at the Sydney Opera House and Arts Centre Melbourne, and invited the orchestra to tour his home country of Italy.

Later in 2018 the AWO toured India, performing in Chennai as the opening act of the Australian Government's 6 month festival of Australian Culture "OzFest" and additional concerts in Kochi (Kerala) and Mumbai under the baton of Briger and with guest soloists French mezzo-soprano Caroline Meng and the Australian born and educated Daniel Dodds, Artistic Director of the Lucerne Festival Strings.

In 2019 Alexander Briger conducted the AWO for performances at Arts Centre Melbourne and for the orchestra's first performance in Canberra at Llewellyn Hall. The AWO Chamber Six performed at City Recital Hall, Sydney.

The AWO commissioned Australian composer and clarinetist, Paul Dean, to compose his Symphony no.1 Black Summer to celebrate its 10th anniversary in 2021.  Briger premiered the piece in 2021 in concerts at the Llewellyn Hall in Canberra, and City Recital Hall, Sydney.  The performances garnered exceptional reviews, and the Australian Arts Review expressed that "Briger has created an orchestral Rolls Royce . . ."

The AWO will be travelling to the United Kingdom (UK) in August 2022, to perform at the Edinburgh International Festival on 19 August and the BBC Proms on 23 August.  The AWO will be there as part of Edinburgh's 75th anniversary celebrations, and the UKAU cultural exchange. Maestro Zubin Mehta will be conducting these concerts, accompanied by Australian soprano, Siobhan Stagg.  The AWO will return to Australia in late August for its concerts in Melbourne and Sydney on Wednesday 31 August and Friday 2 September, conducted once again by Mehta.

Discography

Albums

Awards and nominations

ARIA Music Awards
The ARIA Music Awards is an annual awards ceremony that recognises excellence, innovation, and achievement across all genres of Australian music. They commenced in 1987. 

! 
|-
| 2014
| Stravinsky Rite of Spring / Mahler Symphony No. 1 (with (Zubin Mehta)
| Best Classical Album
| 
| 
|-

Helpmann Award
 2016 - Australian World Orchestra (Conductor Sir Simon Rattle) (won)

References

Australian orchestras
Performing groups established in 2011
2011 establishments in Australia